Baldwin House may refer to the following buildings in the United States:

California
Baldwin Estate, South Lake Tahoe; listed on the National Register of Historic Places (NRHP) in El Dorado County

Connecticut
Timothy Baldwin House, Branford
Zaccheus Baldwin House, Branford
Ives-Baldwin House, Meriden
Gen. Daniel Baldwin House, a property in the Newtown Borough Historic District
Amos Baldwin House, Norfolk
George Baldwin House, North Branford

Hawaii
Dwight Baldwin (missionary) House, Lahaina

Illinois
Hiram Baldwin House, Kenilworth

Indiana
Kendrick-Baldwin House, Logansport

Louisiana
Dufour-Baldwin House, on Esplanade Avenue, New Orleans

Massachusetts
Maria Baldwin House, Cambridge
Baldwin House, Smith College, Northampton
Locke-Baldwin-Kinsley House, Stoneham
Baldwin House (Woburn, Massachusetts)

Montana
Baldwin House (Lodge Grass, Montana)

New Jersey
David Baldwin House, Midland Park

New York
James Baldwin House, on the National Register of Historic Places listings in Manhattan from 59th to 110th Streets
Benjamin Gordon Baldwin House, Norwood
Daniel and Clarissa Baldwin House, Spencertown

North Carolina
Baldwin-Coker Cottage, Highlands

Ohio
Joseph W. Baldwin House, Wyoming

Oregon
Thomas M. Baldwin House, Prineville

Pennsylvania
Baldwin House hotel, part of the Coopersburg Historic District
Baldwin-Reynolds House, Meadville; listed on the NRHP in Lamar County

Rhode Island
Charles H. Baldwin House, Newport

Texas
Benjamin and Adelaide Baldwin House, Paris; listed on the NRHP in Crawford County

Utah
Caleb Baldwin House, Beaver
Charles Baldwin House, Salt Lake City
Nathaniel Baldwin House, Salt Lake City; listed on the NRHP in Salt Lake County

West Virginia
Baldwin-Grantham House, Shanghai

See also
Queen Anne Cottage and Coach Barn, Arcadia, California, constructed by Lucky Baldwin